"I'm Every Woman" is a song by American singer Chaka Khan, released as her debut solo single from her first album, Chaka (1978). It was Khan's first hit outside her recordings with the funk band Rufus. "I'm Every Woman" was produced by Arif Mardin and written by the successful songwriting team Nickolas Ashford and Valerie Simpson. The single established Chaka's career outside the group Rufus, whom she would leave after their eighth studio album Masterjam was released in late 1979.

The track was remixed and re-released in 1989 for Khan's remix album Life Is a Dance: The Remix Project; this mix reached number eight in the United Kingdom. American singer Whitney Houston covered the song in 1992 with production by David Cole and Robert Clivillés and vocals produced by Narada Michael Walden. It was a major hit, peaking at number four on both the Billboard Hot 100 and the UK Singles Chart.

Chart performance
In the United States, "I'm Every Woman" reached number twenty-one on the Billboard Hot 100, number one on the Hot Soul Singles, and number thirty on the disco chart. In the United Kingdom, it peaked at number eleven.

Music video
A music video was produced for Khan's version of "I'm Every Woman" at a time when the value of promotional films was increasing. The video, which features five dancing Chakas dressed in various outfits to represent "every woman", was made a few years before the onset of mainstream coverage of "music promos" through such outlets as MTV, VH1, and BET.

Impact and legacy
Rolling Stone ranked "I’m Every Woman" number 27 in their list of 200 Greatest Dance Songs of All Time in 2022.

Charts

Weekly charts

Certifications

Credits and personnel
Lead and background vocals by Chaka Khan
Background vocals by Will Lee and Hamish Stuart
Produced by Arif Mardin
Drums by Steve Ferrone
Bass by Will Lee
Guitars by Hamish Stuart and Phil Upchurch
Piano by Richard Tee
Engineer by James Douglass

Whitney Houston version

American singer and actress Whitney Houston recorded "I'm Every Woman" for The Bodyguard soundtrack. Houston's version was produced by Narada Michael Walden, with additional production by David Cole and Robert Clivillés. It was released as Houston's second single from the soundtrack on January 2, 1993, by Arista Records. Her version adds the introduction "Whatever you want, whatever you need..." where Houston contributed to the song. A live performance was included in the 1999 release Divas Live '99 as a duet with Chaka Khan. A 1994 performance was included on the 2014 CD and DVD release, Whitney Houston Live: Her Greatest Performances.

Release
When "I'm Every Woman" was released, Houston's preceding single, "I Will Always Love You," was still at number one on the US Billboard Hot 100 (it remained there for eight more weeks). Houston's version of "I'm Every Woman" peaked at number four on the Billboard Hot 100 in just its seventh and eighth week of release; remaining in the top 40 for nineteen weeks. The song became number one on the Billboard Hot Dance Club Play chart, reached number five on the Hot R&B/Hip-Hop Songs chart, and cracked the top 40 on the Hot Adult Contemporary Tracks chart. Houston's cover was also a bigger international hit than the original version as it peaked within the top 5 in the UK and several other countries, and the top 20 in France, Australia, Germany, Sweden and Switzerland. Contrary to popular belief, Houston did not perform backing vocals on Khan's original 1978 version. Chaka Khan confirmed this in an interview with Lester Holt in 2012. As a tribute to her, however, Houston proclaims Khan's name towards the end of the song.

Critical reception
AllMusic editor Stephen Thomas Erlewine praised the song, stating that it's a "first-rate" urban pop song "that skillfully capture[s] Houston at her best." Larry Flick from Billboard wrote, "Utilizing the original version's instantly recognizable vocal arrangement, Houston belts with unbridled confidence and power." Randy Clark from Cashbox called it a "dance-inspired tune", noting "its discotheque feel and obvious dance floor appeal". He added, "Although Whitney is the strongest aspect of this song, the combination of her voice and the house jam should launch this track high onto various charts and playlists alike." A reviewer on CD Universe said the singer "continues to mine her rich vein of ornate balladry and pop-flavored dance workouts on the Ashford & Simpson original". 

Also Entertainment Weeklys Amy Linden praised the cover, adding, "Just as triumphant is her tackling of Chaka Khan's signature tune, "I'm Every Woman". To take on another diva's material requires the female equivalent of cojones, and Houston (wisely) doesn't muck around with the original's overall tone or arrangement. But she sure does it justice, even adding a sly Chaka shout-out as the cut fades." Alan Jones from Music Week felt that the singer "does her best to xerox the performance of Chaka Khan." Stephen Holden of The New York Times wrote, "Though not as exuberantly sexy as the original, her version of Chaka Khan's 1978 hit, "I'm Every Woman", is a respectable imitation." A writer from Rolling Stone called the rendition an overwrought remake and added that Whitney undermined her soul roots. USA Today complimented the song, "She adds surprises: Chaka Khan's "I'm Every Woman" becomes sweaty house music."

Music video
The accompanying music video for "I'm Every Woman" was directed by Randee St. Nicholas, and features a very pregnant Houston performing the song, while scenes from The Bodyguard are intercut into the clip. The video also features cameo appearances by Houston's mother Cissy Houston as well as by Chaka Khan, Valerie Simpson, Martha Wash and labelmate TLC. The song won Houston a NAACP Image Award for Outstanding Music Video, and received a Grammy Award nomination in 1994 for Best Female R&B Vocal Performance.

Track listings and formats

 CD single
"I'm Every Woman" – 4:45
"Who Do You Love" – 3:55

 European CD maxi-single
"I'm Every Woman" (7" single) – 4:44
"I'm Every Woman" (Clivillés & Cole House Mix I) – 10:37
"I'm Every Woman" (a cappella Mix) – 4:27

 UK CD maxi-single
"I'm Every Woman" (7" single) – 4:44
"I'm Every Woman" (Every Woman's House/Club Mix Radio Edit) – 4:40
"I'm Every Woman" (Clivillés & Cole House Mix I) – 10:37
"I'm Every Woman" (Every Woman's House/Club Mix) – 10:14
"I'm Every Woman" (Every Woman's Beat) – 4:11
"I'm Every Woman" (a cappella Mix) – 4:27

 US CD maxi-single
"I'm Every Woman" (Every Woman's House/Club Mix Radio Edit) – 4:40
"I'm Every Woman" (album version) – 4:45
"I'm Every Woman" (Every Woman's House/Club Mix) – 10:14
"I'm Every Woman" (Clivillés & Cole House Mix I) – 10:37
"I'm Every Woman" (Clivillés & Cole House Mix II) – 10:54
"Who Do You Love" – 3:55

 US 12" maxi-single
"I'm Every Woman" (Every Woman's House/Club Mix) – 10:14
"I'm Every Woman" (Every Woman's Beat) – 4:11
"I'm Every Woman" (Clivillés & Cole House Mix I) – 10:37
"I'm Every Woman" (Clivillés & Cole House Mix II) – 10:54
"I'm Every Woman" (The C & C Dub) – 10:03
"I'm Every Woman" (a cappella Mix) – 4:27

Credits and personnel 

 Performed by Whitney Houston
 Produced by Narada Michael Walden
 Additional production and remix by Robert Clivilles and David Cole
 Vocal arrangement inspired by Chaka Khan
 Additional vocal arrangement and production by Robert Clivilles and David Cole
 Roland TR-909 Programming by Louis Biancaniello, James Alfano and Chauncey Mahan
 Recording engineers – Matt Rohr, Marc Reyburn
 Additional production recording engineers – Acar S. Key, Richard Joseph
 Mixing engineer – Bob Rosa
 Executive producers - Clive Davis, Whitney Houston

Charts and certifications

Weekly charts

Year-end charts

Certifications and sales

Release history

Other versions/in popular culture
After the popularity of the Whitney Houston version, The Oprah Winfrey Show unveiled its "I'm Every Woman" campaign in the 1993–94 season, using a cover version with remade lyrics in promos and an instrumental rendition used as the theme song. Girls Aloud covered "I'm Every Woman" on the UK Discomania album released in 2004. In 2006, it was recorded in the fifth season of American Idol by Mandisa, and put on the album American Idol Season 5: Encores. Country pop singer and songwriter Taylor Swift also recorded the song when she was trying to get a record label.

The Chaka Khan version of the song was featured in the King of the Hill Season 11 episode The Peggy Horror Picture Show.

See also
 List of number-one R&B singles of 1978 (U.S.)
 List of UK top 10 singles in 1989
 List of number-one dance singles of 1993 (U.S.)
 Top 50 Singles of 1993 (UK)
 List of RPM number-one dance singles of 1993
 Billboard Year-End Hot 100 singles of 1993
 List of Cash Box Top 100 number-one singles of 1993

References

External links

I'm Every Woman (Chaka Khan) at Discogs
I'm Every Woman (Remix, Chaka Khan) at Discogs
I'm Every Woman (Whitney Houston) at Discogs

1978 songs
1978 debut singles
Chaka Khan songs
Whitney Houston songs
1993 singles
Disco songs
Songs written by Nickolas Ashford
Songs written by Valerie Simpson
American dance-pop songs
American house music songs
Songs with feminist themes
Music videos directed by Bruce Gowers
Music videos directed by Randee St. Nicholas
Song recordings produced by Arif Mardin
Song recordings produced by Narada Michael Walden
Song recordings produced by Robert Clivillés
Warner Records singles
Arista Records singles
Music Week number-one dance singles